Phyllosticta micropuncta is a plant pathogen of the Botryosphaeriaceae family of sac fungi infecting avocados.

References

External links
 USDA ARS Fungal Database

Fungal plant pathogens and diseases
Avocado tree diseases
micropuncta